Fosetyl-Al is an organophosphorus compound that is used as a fungicide.  With the formula [C2H5OP(H)O2]3Al.  It is derived from ethylphosphite.

References

Fungicides
Phosphites
Aluminium compounds